Kevin King (born  is a former professional rugby league footballer who played in the 2000s. He played at club level for the Stanley Rangers ARLFC.

In 2004, he played in the Super League IX for the Castleford Tigers (Heritage No. 816). In 2005, he played in the Super League X for the Wakefield Trinity Wildcats (Heritage No. 1223).

References

External links
Statistics at thecastlefordtigers.co.uk

1985 births
Living people
Batley Bulldogs players
Castleford Tigers players
English rugby league players
Rochdale Hornets players
Rugby league centres
Rugby league second-rows
Rugby league wingers
Wakefield Trinity players
Rugby articles needing expert attention